Gary Hughes is the second studio album released by Gary Hughes.

Track listing
All songs written by Gary Hughes.
 "This Thing of Beauty" – 5:25
 "Seducer" – 4:39
 "I Won't Break Your Heart" – 4:50
 "Blonde Angel" – 5:25
 "Suspended Animation" – 5:04
 "It Must Be Love" – 5:17
 "Till the Rivers Run Dry" – 4:53
 "Criminal" – 4:53
 "We Walk With Angels" – 5:47
 "Now or Never" – 4:11
 "Renegade" – 5:07
The 1997 fifth anniversary re-issue remastered version (NTHEN 40) adds:
"Look At the Rain" – 4:14
The 1997 release replaces track 4 with "Blonde Angel '93" – 5:59
Tracks 10 & 11 recorded live at a soundcheck in Koln, Germany on February 24, 1992.

Personnel
Gary Hughes – vocals, guitars and bass guitar
Aziz Ibrahim – guitars
Lee Revill – guitars
Steve Steadman – bass guitar
Gary Frankland – bass guitar
David Hewson – keyboards
Howard Smith – keyboards
Darren Wilcox – drums
Darren Lamberton – drums
Steve Frankland – drums
David Holt - drums on "Blonde Angel '93" and "Look At The Rain"

Production
Additional Production – David Hewson
Mixing – Gary Hughes and Simon Humphrey (except tracks 10 & 11)
Mixing – Brad Anthony (tracks 10 & 11)
Engineer – Audu Obaje, Rayston Hollyer, Ray Brophy and Simon Humphrey (except tracks 10 & 11)
Engineer – Brad Anthony (tracks 10 & 11)

References

External links 
Heavy Harmonies page
Now & Then Records page

Gary Hughes albums
1992 albums
Albums produced by Gary Hughes